Victor Amaya and Tim Gullikson were the defending champions but Amaya did not compete this year, having played his last professional tournament one month earlier at Stuttgart before retiring from tennis. Gullikson teamed up with his brother Tom Gullikson and lost in the quarterfinals to Sandy Mayer and Balázs Taróczy.

Francisco González and Matt Mitchell won the title by defeating Mayer and Tarózcy 4–6, 6–3, 7–6 in the final.

Seeds

Draw

Finals

Top half

Bottom half

References

External links
 Official results archive (ATP)
 Official results archive (ITF)

1984 Grand Prix (tennis)